Qaleh-ye Farhadiyeh (also Romanized as Qal‘eh-ye Farhādīyeh; also known as Farhādīyeh) is a village in Rostaq Rural District, in the Central District of Khomeyn County, Markazi Province, Iran. At the 2006 census, its population was 19, in 5 families.

References 

Populated places in Khomeyn County